Gorewada Lake (gore-wada) means “gore” Britishers “wada” spot is an artificial lake made by Britishers is situated on the north-west corner of Nagpur city. It is created with a dam 2,350 feet long.

In 1912, Gorewada lake was developed by the water works department as the primary drinking water source for Nagpur's 1.01 lakh population. Bordered by thick forest, Gorewada lake and its surrounding is the habitat for avian species and some wild life. The government of Maharashtra has started to develop a 1914 hectare safari in the forest regions surrounding the lake. Information by many newspapers claimed that it would also roll out he first night-safari in the country. The proposal was a long-drawn one, first proposed in 2005 and the safari started only in 2016. Leopards, Indian deer, Indian Peacock and some more species can be occasionally spotted.

Road near Gorewada lake termed as Gorewada Ring road. Many celebration lawns (open air) are situated in this area.
Nearest area to Gorewada lake is Hamid nagar , azka road , jafar nagar , Zingabai Takli, Borgaon and Gittikhadan.
The place is ruled by politician
Vikas thakre @inc as member of legislative assembly
Archana vivek pathak @bjp as ward incharge.

Fishing 

Though it is largely the task of the water works department to clean and supply water to the city, some pollution in form of garbage and burnt plastic is seen in the section of the lake open for regular strolls. Also, fishing for fish and sea-shells are often seen in the lake.

References 

 Nagpur Lake Photos
 Gorewada BioPark situated at Gorewada Lake, Nagpur

Geography of Nagpur
Tourist attractions in Nagpur
Reservoirs in Maharashtra